A Krabby Patty is a veggie burger sold by the fictional restaurant the Krusty Krab in the animated television series SpongeBob SquarePants. The series' creator, Stephen Hillenburg, expressly stated that the patties do not contain any meat. Created by the restaurant's founder Eugene Krabs and his archenemy Plankton, it is what the main character SpongeBob cooks throughout his job as a fry cook, as well as the restaurant's trademark food and most famous burger in Bikini Bottom. A prominent storyline throughout the series is Krabs' nemesis Plankton trying to steal the Krabby Patty secret formula. This running gag was given a backstory in the special "Friend or Foe", where it is revealed that Krabs and Plankton created the Krabby Patty to compete with the health-violating restaurant Stinky Burgers.

Role in SpongeBob SquarePants 
Krabby Patties make their debut appearance in SpongeBob SquarePants pilot episode "Help Wanted" and have had many different variations throughout the show's run.

The Krabby Patty burger is a menu item sold by the Krusty Krab as a fast food product. It is considered to be one of the most successful foods in Bikini Bottom. The Krabby Patty formula is a closely guarded trade secret, and rival restaurateur Plankton's futile attempts at acquiring the secret formula is a major recurring theme throughout the series. The Krusty Krab usually attracts customers from Bikini Bottom because of the Krabby Patty's renowned taste and the fact that Plankton's restaurant, the Chum Bucket, has a menu consisting of mostly inedible chum. Due to the lack of viable competition, Mr. Krabs is generally free to engage in price gouging, a practice he has been known to do throughout the show. Sometimes the Krusty Krab is shown to have a drive-thru to serve krabby patties seen in the episodes "Driven to Tears" and "Drive Thru" as well as The SpongeBob Movie: Sponge Out of Water. It is noted by Mr. Krabs that the Krusty Krab and the Krabby Patty is clean and disease-free.

Ingredients 
The Krabby Patty is made out of a frozen meatless burger with buns, the patty, pickles, lettuce, tomatoes, cheese, ketchup, mustard, and onions and with other elements according to a Krabby Patty secret formula, though said secret formula has never been revealed in the series. In the episode "Just One Bite," the Krusty Krab is revealed to have a "patty vault" that contains many Krabby Patties.

The Krusty Krab's menu, the Galley Grub, consists mostly of ordinary fast food items, such as french fries and sodas. Its signature sandwich, the Krabby Patty, is celebrated, to a comic degree, by the citizens of Bikini Bottom. In The SpongeBob Movie: Sponge Out of Water, Mr. Krabs states: "The Krabby Patty is what ties us all together! Without it, there will be a complete breakdown of social order!" In the Season 1 episode Pickles, it's revealed that the sandwich comprises two buns, with the patty, lettuce, cheese, onions, tomatoes, ketchup, mustard, and pickles between them (in that order).

Theories 
The formula has been hinted at but remained a mystery throughout the series. A running gag is Plankton's obsession with obtaining it as a way to produce the sandwiches and attract customers to his across-the-street restaurant, the Chum Bucket. The recipe of the patty is a closely guarded trade secret, which have led viewers to speculate about its contents. Several fan theories have been formed to guess the secret ingredient.
Matthew Patrick stated that the sandwich contains "...Four cups of faba beans, one chopped onion, enough breadcrumbs to bind it, liquid smoke, chili pepper, turmeric, one teaspoon of a calcium supplement, flour, salt, seaweed sauce, and lastly the big secret; red algae extract and of course, love. The love and pride that one yellow sponge has for his little baby burgers..."

According to series animator Vincent Waller, "there is absolutely no meat in the Krabby Patty. There's no animal product in there", something which was always planned by series creator Stephen Hillenburg. Mr. Lawrence, a show writer and Plankton's voice actor, explained that the show's writers are not allowed to depict fish as food, or at least fish eating each other as food (as episodes such as "Hooky", "Wishing You Well", and "My Leg?" depict or allude to fish being consumed by humans); he stated that there is no meat served in Bikini Bottom except at the Chum Bucket. Tom Kenny, the voice actor for SpongeBob, joked: "Krabby Patties are hummus!" Some commentators suggest that there is actually no secret ingredient, pointing to Mr. Krabs' miserliness. A writer for Hollywood.com believes that it is "all a ruse that crafty Mr. Krabs came up with in order to stop Plankton from focusing on [t]he Chum Bucket. It's legitimately brilliant marketing!" The episode "Patty Caper" shows that there is truly a secret ingredient in the Krabby Patty, which is delivered to the restaurant with high security. On the possibility that the secret Krabby Patty formula will be revealed in future episodes, Waller said in 2017 that he "would not count on it". In 2019, Waller stated that Hillenburg, who died in 2018, is the only person to have seen it.

Real-life inspirations 

Publications such as USA Today have named it among other fictional foods that many have wanted to exist in real life, but according to the New York Daily News, there are four restaurants which serve a similar burger to the one seen in the show. These burgers include the Snow Crab Crispy Rice, Phuket Fantasy, Angry Crab Benedict, and Soft Shell Crab Taco.

The Krabby Patties have also inspired real life gummy confectionery treats, primarily in New England. In 2008, a doctor with Texas A&M Health Science Center College of Medicine warned parents to be aware of where the candy their child consumes is produced due to contamination then found in Chinese milk; SpongeBob Gummy Krabby Patties were among those candies produced in China. In 2019, a reporter with the student newspaper of Capital University gave the gummy candies a rating of a 2 out of 10 in their review of Halloween candy.

The Krabby Patty has been used by Katy Perry as a second costume on the red carpet at New York's Metropolitan Museum of Art. In The SpongeBob Musical, the Krabby Patty was portrayed by an actor on stage at the Palace Theatre. Various merchandise depicts SpongeBob and the Krabby Patty such as HipDot, as make-up, and as dog toys.

References 

SpongeBob SquarePants

Fictional food and drink
Products introduced in 1999
Fictional elements introduced in 1999